The A210 road is a road in South East London.

References

Roads in England
Roads in London
Streets in the Royal Borough of Greenwich
Transport in the London Borough of Bexley